The following tables lists sports venues in Maryland which are in current use.

References

 
Maryland
Venues
Sports